Daliyat is part of the name of the following places:

Daliyat al-Karmel, Druze town in the Haifa District of Israel
Daliyat al-Rawha', Palestinian village